Ricardo P Lloyd (born 20 November 1993) is a British actor and presenter. He began his career in theatre, appearing in productions, including those by Shakespeare's Globe. In 2020, The Voice named him one of the Top 20 to watch out for, affirming his status as a rising star. In 2022, Lloyd presented and produced his own documentary for BBC Radio 4.

Early life and education 
Ricardo P Lloyd was born on 20 November 1993 in Ipswich, England. His grandparents were a part of the Windrush generation, migrating from Jamaica to England.
Lloyd moved from Ipswich to London with his mother when he was very young. He grew up in the London Borough of Brent, attending Kensal Rise Primary School now known as Ark Franklin Primary Academy. In his teenage years, he went to the secondary school Capital City Academy, and performed in school productions of Bugsy Malone and West Side Story.

He then went down a bad path, hanging around with the wrong crowds trying to fit in, which led him to get into some fights and failing most of his GCSEs. Lloyd later turned his life around, staying at the school's sixth-form to retake some GCSEs and do an A-Level in drama.

However, staff continued to stereotype him. Lloyd eventually left Capital City Academy's sixth-form to pursue a BTEC Level 3 Extended Diploma in performing arts acting at Harrow College (2011–2013). The actor then went on to Buckinghamshire New University to study Performing Arts; Film TV & Stage at undergraduate level (2013–2016). After Lloyd received his BA Honours degree in 2016, he then did an MBA at Anglia Ruskin University (2016–2018) to enhance his skills in business.

Career 
Lloyd began his acting career in theatre, performing in various theatre shows. He then appeared in several short films. He made his professional stage debut in 2015 in a production of Animal Farm at Oxford House (settlement).

Lloyd subsequently starred in the short film University Life (2015) where he played the (lead) protagonist Anthony. The film was a runner-up in a BIFA short film competition. In February 2016, Lloyd played Karam in the stage production Fragile things performed at the Wycombe Swan Theatre. In the same year, he filmed a part in a short film titled Cussin.

In April 2019, Lloyd acted in Shakespeare Walks, where he took on the role of Snug (A Midsummer Night's Dream). He also performed in Shakespeare within the Abbey, produced by Shakespeare's Globe. Lloyd worked alongside Oscar-winning actor Mark Rylance and his wife Claire van Kampen. These shows were created to celebrate Shakespeare's birthday, brought alive by a company of different actors. 

"one of the most moving celebrations of Shakespeare I've experienced" – Michael Billington The GuardianIn November 2019, Lloyd portrayed Romeo in the critically acclaimed topical (theatre) production Excluded, produced by Intermission Theatre, a company which helps disenfranchised teenagers stay away from crime. The play transplanted and re-imagined some of Shakespeare's iconic characters into a London secondary school as they prepared for their GCSEs, highlighting how the education system fails many young people. Lloyd received much praise for his performance.

On 3 November 2019, Lloyd made an appearance on BBC One's Sunday Morning Live season 10, episode 20, presented by Sean Fletcher and Ria Hebden. Lloyd performed a scene from Excluded with fellow cast and was then interviewed by Ria Hebden. He was seen wearing an eye patch with the word 'excluded' on it, created for him by British artist Eugene Ankomah. When interviewed by Vanessa Feltz on her BBC Radio London breakfast radio show (23 October 2019) what it meant, Lloyd said it was a symbol to represent how society "only chooses to see what they want to see concerning young people" or people who come from where he does.

Lloyd also appeared on ITV News London, where he candidly spoke out on the effects of school exclusions, saying: "When you exclude a child, you are essentially saying they're not good enough for society."  He added, "A lot of my peers who have been excluded ended up in prison or dead."

Lloyd has a number of further credits. He worked on Creation Theatre Company's The Time Machine: A Virtual Reality (2020) in the West End. Lloyd performed at the Lyric Theatre as part of the Evolution festival (2020). He also starred in the documentary film Arts hole (2020), which he co-produced with Wendy Richardson and Tara Dominick. Lloyd appeared in Kar-go's promotional video for autonomous delivery UK launch (2020).

In 2021, Lloyd wrote, acted, produced and filmed his own short film titled Call It A Problem, to inspire youth and the community during the COVID-19 pandemic, teaming up with charities The People's FC and Teviot Rangers JFC.

Lloyd starred in the short film Con-Spiracies (2021), produced by the National Film and Television School, where he played lead character Jaden. He also performed a monologue to a select audience for the virtual event My Story, My Monologue hosted by BlackRock with thousands of employees watching.

In January 2022, it was announced that Lloyd would narrate the Audiobook of the crime novel Silenced by Jennie Ensor.

On Saturday, 9 April 2022, Lloyd played John Blanke at the National Maritime Museum part of the Caribbean Takeover celebrating black history. The event was an opportunity for visitors to discover the fusion of cultures from Africa, the Caribbean and Britain. It was the first time in the museum's history that an event was held of that magnitude celebrating black history. Lloyd was joined by other notable public figures including ITV The Chase's Shaun Wallace, as well as Leroy Logan.

In 2022, Lloyd played the lead character Johnny Smythe in the Docudrama Flying for Britain. The film follows Johnny's journey to recruitment into the wartime RAF and his experiences of combat flying as the navigator of a Stirling Bomber. The project was produced in patnership with Royal Airforce Museum and National Lottery Heritage Fund.

Presenting
Lloyd created and presented his own radio documentary entitled My Name Is Ricardo P Lloyd for BBC Radio 4, which received rave reviews. The program was listed as one of the top choice to check out by The Guardian, The times, Daily Star and countless others. According to The Daily Telegraph Lloyd is full of insight''' It was broadcast nationally on 18 July 2022 at 11.00am and made available on BBC Sounds. The documentary features Aml Ameen and Death in Paradise star Tobi Bakare as well as leading people in the entertainment industry.

Recognition, industry supporters and awards
Lloyd has been cited as ‘One of Britain's most promising acting talents’ by My London. In 2020, Lloyd was recognized as a rising actor when The Voice listed him as one of the Top 20 ones to watch out for in business, sport, culture and politics. Additionally, Lloyd was nominated for a Blac award, an award celebration of the achievements of those of the African-Caribbean Community in the UK.

Lloyd has been supported and mentored by different industry leaders, including Hollywood A-listers such as Whoopi Goldberg, David Oyelowo, Naomie Harris, and Mark Rylance, who have encouraged him to continue to stretch himself as an artist and break through barriers in his industry.                                          
                                     
In November 2021, The Guardian published an article that focused on Lloyd and actor David Harewood, comparing the actors' lives and careers. This was part of Black British culture matters, curated by Lenny Henry and Marcus Ryder for The Guardian's Saturday Culture Issue No 7.

On 28 August 2022, Lloyd won the Anglia Ruskin University Vice counsellor alumni Contribution to Culture award.Lloyd was recognised and celebrated by Your Brent Magazine  a magazine by Brent Council for Black History Month 2022 as one of the Black British stars from brent making an impact.

Activism and advocacy
As well as being an actor, Ricardo P Lloyd is an activist. He has continued to use his influence to publicly raise awareness for key social issues such as class discrimination, social exclusion, racism, and diversity in the UK.

Lloyd spoke boldly about the challenges many black British actors face in the industry. In 2021, he wrote an article for The Independent extensively discussing some of his own experiences of discrimination being a black British actor. He has also written articles for various publications including Radio Times, The Big Issue, The Voice,Student Pocket Guide.

 Personal life 
Lloyd is a practising Christian, he has spoken openly about how importance his faith is to him on platforms like Premier Christian Radio, saying it keeps him grounded.
In 2021, he told Church Times:
"Faith has enabled me to survive in this business: faith in God through Christ Jesus. I trust in him that he has a purpose regarding my life and career, and he knows what is best for me. I also need to have faith in myself, my abilities, my value. I have business skill-sets to help me create my own work. I no longer want to just survive, but thrive. I'm also trying to help other people who come from where I come from."

Lloyd revealed his favourite actor of all time is Sidney Poitier. He wrote a tribute to Poitier after hearing of his passing in January 2022, which was published by The Voice. He also is a fan of Michael Jackson since childhood and has said that Michael Jackson's life, career, artistry (work) has greatly inspired him.

In 2020, Lloyd personal life played out in the Print media early that year he was listed on The Voice''s "top 20 ones to watch out for" and was working on several projects before the COVID-19 pandemic. Lloyd then found himself going through a dark period becoming homeless and going through different traumatic experiences. Lloyd spoke out about the lack of support many black men face.

The stories kept on circulating about the actor: "Police appeal after actor is attacked by unknown woman in Lambeth."

One journalist added: "Because of his facial scars Ricardo will also have to step away from the camera and put his acting career on pause."

Credits

Stage

Film

Television

Radio

Music video

Live Online

Audiobook

Other

See also
 Black British people
 List of British actors
 List of people from the London Borough of Brent

References

External links

 Official website
 
Ricardo P. Lloyd YouTube Channel
Threads Radio Interview
Radio Interview Netil Radio The Thursday Fry Up Show with George (29 October 2020)
Interview on The Student pocket guide: Creating Your Own Path An Interview With Ricardo P Lloyd
Ricardo P. Lloyd Interview on Ultravision UK (Women's L.I.K)
Interview on Spotlight Self-Motivating Through Difficult Times with Ricardo P. Lloyd
Interview on The Fan Carpet: Transitioning From Stage To Screen: A Conversation With Rising Star Ricardo P. Lloyd
Ricardo P. Lloyd Interview on The Youth Hub UK
My Name Is Ricardo P Lloyd on BBC Sounds 
 Ricardo P Lloyd on Getty Images

1993 births
21st-century English male actors
Actors from Ipswich
Alumni of Anglia Ruskin University
Alumni of Buckinghamshire New University
Alumni of the Anna Scher Theatre School
BBC people
Black British male actors
British anti-racism activists
Converts to Christianity
English Christians
English male film actors
English male stage actors
English male voice actors
English people of Jamaican descent
Living people
Male actors from London
People from the London Borough of Brent
Popular culture
Royal Shakespeare Company members